The 2021 Euro Hockey League was the 14th season of the Euro Hockey League, Europe's premier club field hockey tournament, organized by the European Hockey Federation.

Due to the COVID-19 pandemic in Europe a different format was used with only one event and 16 less teams. The four participating teams were the four original seeded clubs for the original format. The semi-finals were played on 3 April and the final on 5 April 2021 at the Wagener Stadium in Amstelveen, Netherlands.

Bloemendaal won a record fourth title after defeating first time finalists Atlètic Terrassa 5–2 in the final. Léopold won their first medal after defeating Uhlenhorst Mülheim 4–2 in the bronze medal match.

Effects of the COVID-19 pandemic
In May 2020 it was announced that the first round, usually being played in October, could not be played due to the COVID-19 pandemic in Europe and the format for this season would be changed. On 11 February 2021 it was announced the tournament would be played with only four teams and behind closed doors. The rest of the teams participated in the 2021 Men's Euro Hockey League Cup.

Original format
Originally the number of teams was reduced to only 12 from the usual 20 teams. The remaining teams would have played in the 2021 EHL Cup. The different number of teams also meant a new format for this season. The number one seed from the top four ranked nations received a bye to the Final 8. The remaining eight sides would have played in four knock-out matches for a chance to join them in the Final 8; the losers would subsequently contest ranking matches for 9th and 11th place.

Final4

Bracket

Semi-finals

Third and fourth place

Final

Statistics

Final standings
 Bloemendaal
 Atlètic Terrassa
 Léopold
 Uhlenhorst Mülheim

Goalscorers

See also
2021 Euro Hockey League Women
2021 Men's EuroHockey Indoor Club Cup

References

External links

Euro Hockey League
2020–21 in European field hockey
Field hockey events postponed due to the COVID-19 pandemic
April 2021 sports events in the Netherlands
2021 Euro Hockey League
2021 Euro Hockey League
2021 in Dutch sport